William Thomas Redmond (born January 28, 1954) is an American politician and minister who served as a Republican member of the United States House of Representatives from New Mexico.

Early life and education 
Redmond was born in Chicago. He graduated from Lincoln Christian College in 1979 and was ordained as an independent Christian Church minister. Prior to attending Lincoln Christian College and Seminary, Redmond attended Murray State University, where he majored in Political Science and Accounting. In 1988 Redmond Graduated with a Masters of Divinity (MDiv.) in Theology and Philosophy from Licolon Christian Seminary then moved to New Mexico.

Career 
He served in the United States Army Reserve from 1985 until 1993 as part of an Army chaplain candidate program. Redmond was a minister for the Santa Fe Christian Church and worked as a teacher at University of New Mexico–Los Alamos.

Politics 
He ran for Congress in 1996 and was defeated by the district's longtime Democratic incumbent, Bill Richardson. Three months later, Richardson resigned to become United States Ambassador to the United Nations. Redmond was a candidate in the special election for the balance of Richardson's term. He was initially considered an underdog, but won by 3,000 votes. Green Party candidate Carol Miller took 17% of the vote, running as a more progressive alternative to Democrat Eric Serna. Miller's surprisingly strong campaign may have benefited Redmond by attracting potential Serna voters. Miller received over 17,000 votes, vastly exceeding the 3,000 vote margin Redmond held over Serna.

Despite representing a Democratic district, Redmond had a solidly-conservative voting record. He ran for a full term in 1998 but lost to state Attorney General Tom Udall, who received 53% to Redmond's 43%. Proving just how heavily-Democratic this district was, no Republican has made a serious bid for the 3rd since Redmond left Congress.

He won the Republican nomination for the U.S. Senate in 2000 and was defeated by incumbent Jeff Bingaman 62% to 38%.

In October 1998, Democrats for Redmond described him as "truly an activist congressman" and "a man of integrity and a man who keeps his word". Reasons expressed for Democratic support for Redmond included "accomplishing more on the Land Grant issue in 16 months than any other elected official in 150 years" and introducing an amendment to the Radiation Exposure Compensation Act in order to bring justice to the affected uranium miners of New Mexico. He was also endorsed by the All Indian Pueblo Council for fighting for the rights of Native Americans.

References

External links

 

1955 births
Living people
American members of the Churches of Christ
American Christian clergy
Christians from New Mexico
Murray State University alumni
Military personnel from Illinois
Politicians from Chicago
United States Army reservists
University of New Mexico faculty
Republican Party members of the United States House of Representatives from New Mexico